Keith Wallace, M.S. Oenology and Viticulture (University of California, Davis) is the wine columnist for The Daily Beast. He founded The Wine School of Philadelphia.

Previously he served as an executive chef and a journalist for National Public Radio, as well as a winemaker and wine consultant in the United States and Italy.

Wine School of Philadelphia
Founded in 2001 by Wallace, The Wine School of Philadelphia is a school for sommeliers, wine educators, and winemakers. It offers sommelier certification via the National Wine School. In 2018, it was the highest rated wine school in the United States.

Publications
He has contributed to Philadelphia Magazine, Philadelphia Style, Windows on the World Complete Wine Course: 25th Anniversary Edition and Barron's New Wine Lovers Companion, among other publications. He created and co-starred in the Philly Uncorked show for www.philly.com.

His food and wine book Corked & Forked: Four Seasons of Eats and Drinks was published by Running Press in 2011. The book was critically hailed by multiple publications, including Publishers Weekly, Library Journal and Booklist. The book went on to hit the Amazon Bestseller list for Food and Wine books in 2011.

Television
Wallace has been the star of two shows. In 2008, he co-wrote and co-starred in Philly Uncorked. Produced by Philly.com, the show featured Wallace and his co-star Maria Valetta. The show revolved around wine education and wine recommendations. It was underwritten by the PLCB and filmed by Banyan Productions.

The upcoming show Whine & Cheese features Mr. Wallace as the show's wine expert. He is featured in all eleven of the first season's episodes.

Controversy
The Wine School of Philadelphia received national press attention in 2009 when the WWE challenged its trademark application with the U.S. Patent & Trademark Office for the mark, "Sommelier Smackdown".  Litigation surrounding the school's intellectual property rights is ongoing.

Also in 2009, the Wine School and founder Wallace were featured on NPR's All Things Considered as a result of Wallace's controversial article published in The Daily Beast, "How Wine Became Like Fast Food".

Epilepsy
In 2018, the podcast Philly Who revealed that Wallace had had epilepsy since a car crash that left him severely injured and also killed his fiancé in Baltimore, Maryland. During the interview, he admitted to working as a winemaker in Napa Valley and Chianti for years without revealing his disability to his employers. 
. A previous article in the neighborhood newspaper Chestnut Hill Local featured a story on his seizure dog, Rosie.

See also
List of wine personalities

References

External links
 The Wine School Website
 The Wine School Blog

Living people
Year of birth missing (living people)
Oenologists
Wine critics
American educators
University of California, Davis alumni
American people with disabilities